The Republican Party of Texas (RPT) is the affiliate of the United States Republican Party in the state of Texas. It is currently chaired by Matt Rinaldi, succeeding Allen West who resigned prior to the expiration of his term to run for governor of Texas. The party is headquartered in Austin. The RPT is legally considered to be a political action committee. It is currently the state's favored party, controlling the supermajority of Texas' U.S. House seats, both U.S. Senate seats, both houses of the state legislature with majorities, the governorship, the supermajority of the State Board of Education, and every other executive and judicial office elected statewide.

History

The Republican Party developed dramatically in Texas during the Reconstruction era, after constitutional amendments freeing the slaves and giving suffrage to black males. Blacks joined the party that had ensured the end of slavery. African-American leaders, frequently men of mixed race who had been free and educated before the American Civil War, provided leadership in extending education and work opportunities to blacks after the war. They supported establishment of a public school system for the first time. Men such as William Madison McDonald in Fort Worth, Norris Wright Cuney in Galveston, and Henry Clay Ferguson worked for the black community and the state.

In 1870, Edmund J. Davis was elected Governor, but was soundly defeated in 1874. In the year 1876, Republicans had made gradual gains in Texas, earning nearly one-third of the statewide vote and electing a small number of candidates to the State Legislature (including several African Americans).

After the Reconstruction era, the Republican Party of Texas gradually lost power, and after the turn of the century, the "Lily Whites" pushed blacks out of power. The Democrats passed disfranchising laws near the turn of the century requiring poll taxes be paid prior to voter registration; together with the party establishing white primaries, black voting dropped dramatically, from more than 100,000 statewide in the 1890s, to 5,000 in 1906.  Mexican Americans and poor whites were also adversely affected by such measures. For more than 100 years, the Republicans were a minority party in the state. As a result, the biggest base of electoral support for the Republican Party in Texas during this time was the German Texan community in the Texas Hill Country, with the majority-German Gillespie, Guadalupe and Kendall counties constituting the most Republican counties in the state of Texas throughout the late 19th and into the 20th century.

Between the departing of Robert B. Hawley from his second U.S. House term in 1901 and the seating of Bruce Alger in 1954, the sole Republican to represent Texas in Congress was Harry M. Wurzbach, a politician from the German Texan community in the Hill Country who served in the U.S. House for most of the 1920s and left office in 1931. The first Republican statewide primary was held in 1926, but drew only 15,239 voters. By contrast, the Democratic primary in the same year drew 821,234 voters, as disfranchisement was well established, and Texas was essentially a one-party, white-only voting state. Only two more Republican primaries were run in the next thirty-four years.

1960–present
In 1961, James A. Leonard became the first executive director of the organization. He is credited as the "architect" of John Tower's successful campaign to fill Lyndon Johnson's vacant U.S. Senate seat, a victory that was a breakthrough in the party's attempts to gain a foothold in Texas politics.

In 1966, two Republicans were elected to the U.S. House of Representatives, including future President George H. W. Bush, for the first time since Reconstruction. That same year, three Republicans were elected to the Texas House of Representatives, and the first Republican was elected to the Texas Senate in 39 years. By 1972, Texas Republicans had increased their gains to 17 members of the Texas House and 3 members of the Texas Senate.

The true turning point for Texas Republicans occurred in the May 1976 primary, when Ronald Reagan defeated Gerald Ford by a two-to-one margin in the state's presidential primary.  According to former Secretary of State James A. Baker III, due to Reagan's victory in the Texas primary, "the whole shape and nature of the state changed."

104 years after the most recent previous Republican governor, Bill Clements eked out a narrow victory in November 1978. In 1984, Reagan, George H. W. Bush, and Phil Gramm led a GOP ticket that relied upon the RPT to provide a centralized network of communications. Throughout the rest of the decade, the total Republican vote continued to increase, and the party made large gains in both the state legislature and in local races.

Since 1994, every statewide elected office has been held by a Republican. Both houses of the Texas Legislature feature Republican majorities. The last time Texas was carried by a Democratic presidential candidate was in 1976, when the state voted for Jimmy Carter.

George H. W. Bush (41st) and his son George W. Bush (43rd) are the only Republican Presidents from Texas.

In 2020, the RPT adopted the slogan "We are the storm", a phrase also used by believers in the QAnon conspiracy theory, which party chair Allen West identified as a quotation from an unspecified poem.

2022 platform 
Some 5,100 delegates and alternates attended the party's June 2022 convention in Houston, its first in three years. The Log Cabin Republicans, an organization that advocates for LGBT rights, was banned from attending the convention. Attendees approved resolutions including the false assertion that President Joe Biden "was not legitimately elected." The convention included three screenings of 2000 Mules, a recent film by conspiracy theorist Dinesh D'Souza that falsely alleged an organized criminal "ballot harvesting" scheme by Democratic-aligned operatives to rig the 2020 presidential election against Donald Trump. The party adopted a platform change declaring homosexuality "an abnormal lifestyle choice" and further declared opposition to "all efforts to validate transgender identity". Attendees also approved a resolution calling for the full repeal of the 1965 Voting Rights Act. The new platform called for a ban on "teaching, exposure, and/or discussion of sexual matters (mechanics, feelings, orientation or 'gender identity' issues)" in schools, including the prohibition of teaching sex education, while calling on Texas schools to teach about the "dignity of the preborn human". The new platform also stated: "Texas retains the right to secede from the United States, and the Texas Legislature should be called upon to pass a referendum consistent thereto." The party rebuked longtime Texas senator John Cornyn for participating in bipartisan negotiations regarding guns, after a recent series of mass shootings. The platform also called for the creation of a state-level electoral college system inspired by the United States Electoral College, in which voters from each senate district would vote for electors who would then elect candidates to statewide offices.

Former President Donald Trump praised the platform, saying that "they know that a Country cannot survive without Free and Fair Elections." The resolutions were described by The Washington Post as embracing far-right rhetoric and as a far-right platform by The New York Times. Reason called the "LGBT component" of the platform "a weird throwback" that is "reminiscent of how conservatives used to talk about gay marriage back in the 1990s." The decision to exclude the Log Cabin Republicans from the convention was criticized by Donald Trump Jr., who said in a statement to Breitbart News that it amounted to “canceling a group of gay conservatives who are standing in the breach with us”. The American Conservative described the platform as showing a turn "toward a conservation of the spirit of Christendom, even if it means departing from the Union." that "gives the RNC much to ponder." According to the Houston Chronicle, "Measures adopted to the party's platform at the convention are not set laws, rather they act as a 'mission statement' of sorts for the party over the next two years", and according to the National Public Radio "It remains an open question as to how closely the priorities outlined in the 2022 platform reflect the views of regular Republicans in Texas". Party platforms in Texas are non-binding, a frequent source of frustration for the most hardcore partisan activists.

Current elected officials

Texas Republicans currently control all elected statewide offices, a supermajority in the State Board of Education, a majority in the Texas Senate, and a majority in the Texas House of Representatives. Republicans also hold both of the state's U.S. Senate seats and 25 of the state's 38 U.S. House seats (a supermajority).

Members of Congress

U.S. Senate
Republicans have controlled both of Texas's seats in the U.S. Senate since 1993:

U.S. House of Representatives
Out of the 38 seats Texas is apportioned in the U.S. House of Representatives, 25 are currently held by Republicans, making it the largest Republican delegation in the U.S. House:
 TX-01: Nathaniel Moran
 TX-02: Dan Crenshaw
 TX-03: Keith Self
 TX-04: Pat Fallon
 TX-05: Lance Gooden
 TX-06: Jake Ellzey
 TX-08: Morgan Luttrell
 TX-10: Michael McCaul
 TX-11: August Pfluger
 TX-12: Kay Granger
 TX-13: Ronny Jackson
 TX-14: Randy Weber
 TX-15: Monica De La Cruz
 TX-17: Pete Sessions
 TX-19: Jodey Arrington
 TX-21: Chip Roy
 TX-22: Troy Nehls
 TX-23: Tony Gonzales
 TX-24: Beth Van Duyne
 TX-25: Roger Williams
 TX-26: Michael C. Burgess
 TX-27: Michael Cloud
 TX-31: John Carter
 TX-36: Brian Babin
 TX-38: Wesley Hunt

Statewide officials
Republicans control all nine of the elected statewide offices:
 Governor: Greg Abbott
 Lieutenant Governor: Dan Patrick
 Attorney General: Ken Paxton
 Comptroller of Public Accounts: Glenn Hegar
 State Land Commissioner: Dawn Buckingham
 State Agriculture Commissioner: Sid Miller
 Railroad Commission Chairman: Jim Wright
 Railroad Commissioner: Wayne Christian
 Railroad Commissioner: Christi Craddick

State legislative leaders
 President of the Senate: Dan Patrick
 Speaker of the House: Dade Phelan

State Republican Executive Committee Members
Biannually, in even-numbered years, delegates at the Texas GOP State Convention elect a man and a woman from each of the thirty-one State Senatorial districts to serve a two-year term on the State Republican Executive Committee (SREC).  The State Republican Executive Committee along with the elected State Chair and State Vice Chair manage the affairs of the Republican Party of Texas between state conventions.

List of state party chairs

John L. Haynes (1867-?)
Edmund J. Davis (1875-1883)
Norris Wright Cuney (1886-1896)
William Madison McDonald (1897-1898)
Henry Clay Ferguson (1898-1900)
Cecil A. Lyon (1900-1916)
Rentfro B. Creager (1920–50)
Orville Bullington (1951–1952)
Thad Hutcheson (1958)

State Party Chairmen since 1962
 Peter O'Donnell (1962–1969)
 William Steger (1969–1971)
 Missing (1971–1976)
 Ray Hutchison – (1976–1977)
 Ray Barnhart – (1977–1979)
 Chet Upham – (1979–1983)
 George Strake Jr. – (1983–1988)
 Fred Meyer – (1988–1994)
 Tom Pauken – (1994–1997)
 Susan Weddington – (1997–2003)
 Tina Benkiser – (2003–2009)
 Cathie Adams – (2009–2010)
 Steve Munisteri – (2010–2015)
 Tom Mechler – (2015–2017)
 James Dickey – (2017– 2020)
 Allen West – (2020–2021)
 Matt Rinaldi – (2021–present)

Auxiliary organizations
The party has a number of affiliates and auxiliary organizations, including the Texas Federation of College Republicans, High School Republicans of Texas, Texas Federation of Republican Women (TFRW), Texas Republican County Chairmen's Association, Texas Young Republican Federation (TYRF), Texas Federation for Republican Outreach, Texas Republican Assembly, and Texas Federation of Hispanic Republicans.

References

External links
 The Republican Party of Texas website
 Texas House Republican Caucus
 Texas Federation of Republican women
 Texas Young Republican Federation
 2016 Texas Republican Party Platform

Political parties in Texas
Texas
Organizations that oppose LGBT rights in the United States
Paleoconservative parties in the United States
Right-wing populism in the United States
Secessionist organizations in the United States